The eleventh and final season of The Walking Dead, an American post-apocalyptic horror television series on AMC, premiered on August 22, 2021, and concluded on November 20, 2022, consisting of 24 episodes. Developed for television by Frank Darabont, the series is based on the eponymous series of comic books by Robert Kirkman, Tony Moore, and Charlie Adlard. The executive producers are Kirkman, David Alpert, Scott M. Gimple, Angela Kang, Greg Nicotero, Joseph Incaprera, Denise Huth, and Gale Anne Hurd, with Kang as showrunner for her third and final season. The eleventh season has received positive reviews by critics.

This season adapts material from issues #175–193 of the comic book series and focuses on the group's encounter with the Commonwealth, a large network of communities that has advanced equipment and over fifty thousand survivors living in their settlements. Additionally, the season also focuses on the group's confrontation with the Reapers, a mysterious faction of hostile survivors that attacked and took Meridian, the former home of Maggie (Lauren Cohan) and her new people, the Wardens.

Cast

Main cast

The eleventh season features twenty-three series regulars overall. Callan McAuliffe and Cooper Andrews are added to the opening credits after previously being credited as "also starring". Beginning with episode 17, Eleanor Matsuura, Lauren Ridloff, Cailey Fleming, Nadia Hilker, Cassady McClincy, Angel Theory, Paola Lázaro, Michael James Shaw, Josh Hamilton, and Laila Robins are added to the opening credits after being credited as "also starring".

Starring
 Norman Reedus as Daryl Dixon, a skilled hunter and former recruiter for Alexandria. He is also the owner of Dog.
 Melissa McBride as Carol Peletier, a survivor who has overcome several traumas, is a skilled and ingenious fighter, and now resides at Alexandria. She is also ex-wife to Ezekiel.
 Lauren Cohan as Maggie Greene, the former leader of the Hilltop who has a grudge against Negan for killing her husband, Glenn.
 Christian Serratos as Rosita Espinosa, a pragmatic member of the group who is mother to her and late Siddiq's child, Coco. She is also in a relationship with Gabriel.
 Josh McDermitt as Eugene Porter, an intelligent survivor who has overcome his fear of walkers. He is leading an expedition to a distant community.
 Seth Gilliam as Gabriel Stokes, a priest and head of the council of Alexandria who has reconciled his beliefs with what needs to be done to survive. He is also in a relationship with Rosita.
 Ross Marquand as Aaron, a former recruiter from Alexandria who is adoptive father to Gracie.
 Khary Payton as Ezekiel, the charismatic former leader of the Kingdom and ex-husband to Carol. He is also accompanying Eugene's expedition to a distant community.
 Cooper Andrews as Jerry, a former resident of the Kingdom and Ezekiel's right-hand man who is husband to Nabila.
 Callan McAuliffe as Alden, a former member of the Saviors. He had been in a relationship with Enid, who was killed by Alpha.
 Jeffrey Dean Morgan as Negan, the reformed former leader of the Saviors who formed a parental bond with Alpha's daughter, Lydia, during the Whisperer War.
 Eleanor Matsuura as Yumiko, a proficient archer and former criminal defense lawyer before the apocalypse who is ex-girlfriend to Magna. She is also accompanying Eugene's expedition to a distant community.
 Lauren Ridloff as Connie, a deaf former member of Magna's group who forms a close bond with Daryl and was presumed to be dead during the Whisperer War. She was later found by Virgil near Oceanside, albeit weak and malnourished.
 Cailey Fleming as Judith Grimes, the daughter of Lori Grimes and Shane Walsh, and adopted daughter of Rick Grimes and Michonne.
 Nadia Hilker as Magna, the feisty former leader of a small group of roaming survivors. She is also ex-girlfriend to Yumiko.
 Cassady McClincy as Lydia, Alpha's daughter and former Whisperer, who formed a parental bond with Negan during the Whisperer War and now resides in Alexandria. She had been in a relationship with Henry, who was killed by Alpha.
 Angel Theory as Kelly, Connie's alert and protective sister who has a gradual hearing loss.
 Paola Lázaro as Juanita "Princess" Sanchez, a quirky and flamboyant survivor who has suffered various traumas in her past. She is also accompanying Eugene's expedition to a distant community.
 Michael James Shaw as Michael Mercer, a resident of the Commonwealth who serves as the general of the Commonwealth military.
 Josh Hamilton as Lance Hornsby, the deputy governor and director of operations to the Commonwealth.
 Laila Robins as Pamela Milton, the governor of the Commonwealth.

Also starring
 Lynn Collins as Leah Shaw, a member of the Reapers and former owner of Dog who formed a loving connection with Daryl while searching for Rick after his disappearance.
 Margot Bingham as Maxxine "Stephanie" Mercer, a resident of the Commonwealth who communicated with Eugene over the radio the previous season. She is also Mercer's younger sister.

Supporting cast

Alexandria Safe-Zone
 C. Thomas Howell as Roy, a former resident and guard of the Hilltop.
 Jackson Pace as Gage, a former resident of the Hilltop who resented Lydia over the deaths of his friends during the Whisperer War.
 Antony Azor as Rick "R.J." Grimes Jr., the son of Rick and Michonne.
 Anabelle Holloway as Gracie, the adoptive daughter of Aaron.
 Mandi Christine Kerr as Barbara, a resident of Alexandria.

The Hilltop
 Kerry Cahill as Dianne, one of Ezekiel's top soldiers and a skilled archer.
 Gustavo Gomez as Marco, a supply runner of the Hilltop.

Oceanside
 Avianna Mynhier as Rachel Ward, a teenage member of Oceanside who represents her community.
 Dan Fogler as Luke, a former music teacher who has come to appreciate safety in numbers. He is also in a relationship with Jules.
 Alex Sgambati as Jules, a member of Oceanside who is in a relationship with Luke.

The Wardens
 Okea Eme-Akwari as Elijah, a mysterious and masked member of the Wardens.
 James Devoti as Cole, a trusted member of the Wardens.
 Kien Michael Spiller as Hershel Rhee, the son of Glenn and Maggie.
 Glenn Stanton as Frost, a member of the Wardens who despises Negan for what he did to their leader Maggie.
 Laurie Fortier as Agatha, a member of the Wardens who also despises Negan.
 Marcus Lewis as Duncan, a tough member of the Wardens who also despises Negan.

The Reapers
 Ritchie Coster as Pope, the leader of the Reapers and a veteran of the War in Afghanistan.
 Jacob Young as Deaver, a member of the Reapers.
 Alex Meraz as Brandon Carver, a member of the Reapers and Leah's right-hand man.
 Dikran Tulaine as Mancea, a member of the Reapers who serves as the group's priest.
 Branton Box as Fisher, a vicious member of the Reapers.
 Eric LeBlanc as Marcus Powell, a member of the Reapers who befriends Daryl.
 Robert Hayes as Paul Wells, an arrogant member of the Reapers.
 Hans Christopher as Nicholls, a member of the Reapers who encounters Gabriel.
 Ethan McDowell as Ira Washington, a stoic member of the Reapers.
 Dane Davenport as Ancheta, a member of the Reapers who serves as the group's engineer.
 Michael Shenefelt as Bossie, a member of the Reapers who stalks Maggie and Negan.

The Commonwealth
 Carrie Genzel as Clark, a resident and auditor for the Commonwealth.
 Matthew Cornwell as Evans, a resident and auditor for the Commonwealth.
 Chelle Ramos as Shira, a resident and spy for the Commonwealth.
 Ian Anthony Dale as Tomi, a long-time resident of the Commonwealth and Yumiko's long-lost brother.
 Teo Rapp-Olsson as Sebastian Milton, Pamela's entitled and arrogant son.
 Courtney Dietz as Kayla Brand, a resident of the Commonwealth and Sebastian's girlfriend.
 Jason Turner as Marcus Colvin, a lawyer in the Commonwealth who prosecutes Eugene.
 Cameron Roberts as Tyler Davis, a former soldier of the Commonwealth military who was dishonorably discharged following the events of the previous season.
 Michael Tourek as Roman Calhoun, a mysterious resident of the Commonwealth who works for Lance.
 Nicholas Velez as Theo, a nurse at the Commonwealth who befriends Ezekiel.
 Jason Butler Harner as Toby Carlson, a ruthless former CIA agent who works for Hornsby.
 Wynn Everett as April Martens, a resident of the Commonwealth who participates Sebastian's heist.
 Monique Grant as Vickers, the colonel of the Commonwealth military.
 Greg Perrow as Nelson, a soldier of the Commonwealth military who attended Gabriel's sermons.
 Brian McClure as Wilson, a fearful train engineer for the Commonwealth.
 Mahdi Cocci as Roberts, a soldier of the Commonwealth military.
 Elizabeth Becka as Marian George, a judge in the Commonwealth.
 Dexter Tillis as Rose, the lieutenant of the Commonwealth military.

Riverbend
 Medina Senghore as Annie, a resident of Riverbend and Negan's wife.
 Michael Biehn as Ian, the unhinged leader of the Riverbend with a twisted sense of humor.
 Jenique Hendrix as Hart, an intimidating resident of Riverbend who wields a long scythe.

Miscellaneous
 Brad Fleischer as Keith, the leader of the remaining Whisperers residing in the ruins of Hilltop.
 Jesse C. Boyd as Edward, the second-in-command the Wolves who appears in Aaron's dream.
 Kevin Carroll as Virgil, a survivor who sought Michonne's help to look for his family. He later found Connie near Oceanside, albeit weak and malnourished.
 Andrew Lincoln as Rick Grimes, a former sheriff's deputy from King County, Georgia, and the former leader of the Alexandria Safe-Zone who was presumed to be dead in the ninth season.
 Danai Gurira as Michonne: a katana-wielding warrior and Rick's romantic partner who left the group to search for her lover.

Episodes

Production
The series was renewed for an eleventh season in October 2019. The eleventh season was officially announced on September 9, 2020, as the final season with Angela Kang serving as showrunner. In July 2020, AMC announced that season 11 would not premiere in October 2020 as planned due to production delays caused by the COVID-19 pandemic.

In 2014, executive producer David Alpert said that the comics have given them enough ideas for Rick Grimes and company over the next seven years. "I happen to love working from source material, specifically because we have a pretty good idea of what season 10 is gonna be," Alpert said. He continued by saying: "We know where seasons 11 and 12 [will be]... we have benchmarks and milestones for those seasons if we're lucky enough to get there." In September 2018, AMC CEO Josh Sapan further clarified Alpert's statement, saying the network plan on continuing The Walking Dead as a franchise for another 10 years, including new films and television series based on the original comic book series.

AMC confirmed in September 2020 that the series would conclude with the eleventh season, covering 24 episodes over a two-year broadcast period, at the same time as announcing a spinoff series involving the characters Daryl and Carol, set to start airing in 2023. In April 2022, the project was retooled to be entirely Daryl-focused, and McBride departed the project. The series is set and to be filmed in Europe in mid-2022, which would make it logistically untenable for McBride.

Filming
In March 2020, it was reported that pre-production had been halted and that filming would be delayed three to four weeks also due to the COVID-19 pandemic. Filming for the final season began in February 2021 and was completed in March 2022. The series moved from shooting on 16 mm film to digital beginning with the six bonus episodes from season 10. This change was prompted due to the COVID-19 pandemic and safety precautions with there being fewer "touch points" with digital than film. Showrunner Angela Kang stated they would use post-production techniques to maintain the look of the series. During filming in March 2022, Norman Reedus suffered from a concussion on set, which pushed back filming of the show's final episode.

Casting
In October 2019, Lauren Cohan was confirmed to be returning to the series as Maggie, after being absent since early in the ninth season. Cohan officially returned to the series near the end of the tenth season. In July 2020, Margot Bingham was confirmed to reprise her role as Stephanie for this season; she previously appeared in season 10 in a voice-only role. In March 2021, it was announced that Michael James Shaw had been cast in the series regular role of Mercer. In April 2021, Jacob Young was cast as Deaver, a member of the Reapers. In September 2021, Jeffrey Dean Morgan's 11-year-old son, Gus Morgan, made a cameo appearance in the fifth episode as a featured walker.

Release
The final season, titled "The Final Season Trilogy", premiered on August 22, 2021, on AMC and contains 24 episodes that split into three eight-episode airing blocks, with the series concluded on November 20, 2022. It also premiered a week early on August 15, 2021, on AMC+ and each episode of the season was made available a week before its broadcast date, excluding the final episode. In the UK and Ireland, the season debuted on August 23, 2021, on Disney+ via its Star hub. The first nine episodes were all released on Disney+ in Denmark via Star on February 21, 2022.

Reception

Critical response
The eleventh season of The Walking Dead has received generally positive reviews from critics. On Rotten Tomatoes, the season holds a score of 80% with an average rating of 7.02 out of 10, based on 237 reviews. The site's critical consensus reads: "While the sense of finality is diminished by the promise of even more spinoffs, The Walking Deads eleventh conclusion is a solid enough conclusion to an epic tale of zombies that never had a clear offramp to begin with." Paul Dailly of TV Fanatic gave the first two episodes 4.5 out of 5 stars, calling the episodes "dark, filled with stakes and nail-biting moments". Writing for Forbes, Erik Kain gave the two-part premiere a positive review and considered them "a pretty damn impressive introduction to Season 11" and that they have him "excited for what's to come". In contrast, Kirsten Acuna of Insider wrote a slightly less positive review, stating that the episodes are "decent" and "satisfying, but it doesn't feel like a big-budget premiere" that she was hoping for.

Ratings

References

External links 

 
 

11
2021 American television seasons
2022 American television seasons
Television productions postponed due to the COVID-19 pandemic